Constantin Tudose (1911 – 1954) was a Romanian racing cyclist. He rode in the 1936 Tour de France.

References

1911 births
1954 deaths
Romanian male cyclists
Place of birth missing